Saint Spiridon Orthodox Cathedral is a cathedral of the Orthodox Church of America in the Cascade neighborhood of Seattle, Washington, United States.

Founded in 1895, the cathedral's multi-ethnic congregation has its roots in an Orthodox mission to Alaska in the 18th Century. The present church dates from 1941. The church's patron saint is Saint Spyridon.

References

External links

Cascade, Seattle
Churches in Seattle
Eastern Orthodox cathedrals in the United States